Aspergillus acidus is a species of fungus in the genus Aspergillus. Aspergillus acidus can be used in food fermentation for tea.

References

Further reading 
 
 
 http://www.fung-growth.org

acidus
Fungi described in 1989
Molds used in food production